Radostowo may refer to the following places:
Radostowo, Pomeranian Voivodeship (north Poland)
Radostowo, Olsztyn County in Warmian-Masurian Voivodeship (north Poland)
Radostowo, Szczytno County in Warmian-Masurian Voivodeship (north Poland)
Radostowo, West Pomeranian Voivodeship (north-west Poland)